The Vashi Bridge, also known as Thane Creek Bridge or the Second Thane Creek Bridge, is a road bridge completed in the late 1990s across Thane Creek, which connects the city of Mumbai to the Indian mainland at Navi Mumbai. The bridge links the suburb of Mankhurd in Mumbai with Vashi in Navi Mumbai, the satellite city of Mumbai. It is one of four entry points into Mumbai (the other three being the Airoli Bridge upstream across Thane Creek, Mulund, and Dahisar), and handles traffic directed towards the region to the south and east of Mumbai.

The bridge replaces the old Thane Creek or Vashi Bridge, built in 1973 and still standing to the north of the current bridge, but now closed to traffic because of faulty construction. , it is planned to build a third Thane Creek/Vashi Bridge.

There is also a railway bridge to the south of both road bridges.

History

Old bridge

The first bridge to connect Mumbai to Navi Mumbai was conceived by Adi Kanga and was built in 1973. Within two years of its opening to traffic, corrosion cracks were noted on the bottom side of the prestressed girders of some spans. This led to a series of extensive repairs including external prestressing. It was simultaneously decided to construct a new bridge to replace the faulty one.

Construction of new bridge
Construction on a new bridge began in 1987 and opened to traffic in 1994 (or 1995 or 1997). The original Vashi Bridge or the 1st Thane Creek Bridge remains closed to traffic.

Proof Consultants were appointed to oversee each aspect of planning, design and construction. Open foundations were taken into the bedrock with foundation concrete being laid in the dry, with the sea water being pumped out using submersible pumps. The superstructure was a P. S. C. box girder, one for each carriageway, constructed using balanced cantilever cast-in-situ segments. It was constructed by U. P. State Bridge Corporation Ltd., and won the most outstanding concrete structure award.

Description
It has several unique features in its construction and design, with emphasis on durability and a formal QA/QC programme.

Third bridge planned

Lane expansion work on Vashi Bridge was scheduled to begin in 2018, with the authorities identifying Larsen and Toubro as the lowest bidder for the contract. A High Court decision cleared the way for construction to proceed in January 2020, but , the new bridge had not yet started construction. Concerns were raised about the amount of mangroves that would be lost under the current plan, an estimated .

Bridge locations
The old bridge lies just to the north of the present Vashi Bridge, and the railway bridge further south (labelled "Mankhurd Vashi Railway Bridge"), can be seen on the map.

The Airoli Bridge is further upstream across Thane Creek, while the  Mumbai Trans Harbour Link is under construction further south.

See also
 List of longest bridges in the world
 List of longest bridges above water in India
Vikhroli-Koparkhairane Link Road

References

Bridges in Maharashtra
Transport in Navi Mumbai
Buildings and structures in Navi Mumbai
Box girder bridges
Bridges completed in 1997
1997 establishments in Maharashtra
20th-century architecture in India